Anu Ramamoorthy is a Malaysian actress and Model from the Malaysian Indian origin. She was one of the finalist for the Miss World Malaysia 2012
and known for acting in Malaysian Tamil Language movie and television series.

Selected filmography

2013
 Ragasiya Kathali - Telemovie

2015
 Pinnokam- movie
 Porratam - drama
 Grahanam - drama

2016
 Ais Kosong (Movie)

References

External links
 

Living people
Malaysian film actresses
Malaysian television actresses
Malaysian people of Indian descent
Malaysian people of Tamil descent
Malaysian female models
Year of birth missing (living people)
21st-century Malaysian actresses